British Mount Everest reconnaissance expedition may refer to:

 1921 British Mount Everest reconnaissance expedition
 1935 British Mount Everest reconnaissance expedition
 1951 British Mount Everest reconnaissance expedition